HC Motor České Budějovice is a professional men's ice hockey club, based in České Budějovice, Czech Republic. It is a member of the Czech Extraliga (ELH) after reforming when the original club, now known as Mountfield HK, moved to Hradec Králové over a sponsorship dispute.
Home stadium of the team ČEZ Motor České Budějovice is Budvar Arena in České Budějovice.

History

Bandy era in České Budějovice
The long history started in 1911, when group of young gymnasium students devised a plan to start a bandy team. Their first hockey rinks were situated exactly where the Malše river and Vltava river merge. Dr. Zdeněk Černý was the first coach, manager, as well as a player of the team. The bandy club lasted until World War I. Some of the first victims of the war were players from České Budějovice such as Áda Schrabal, Karel Selinka, Jan Vrkoč, and Leo Feigl.

Adaptation to ice hockey
On 3 December 1921 SK České Budějovice played its first amateur ice hockey match in Strakonice.

On 10 January 1928 a club known as AC Stadion České Budějovice was founded by the merging two clubs in České Budějovice - Viktoria and Slovan. The club joined Czechoslovak First Ice Hockey League, the nation's top ice hockey league, in 1936. In their first season, they finished third behind LTC Praha and AC Sparta Praha.

Lone championship & decades of failure
In the 1950–51 season, the club, now called SKP České Budějovice, won its first and only championship in any top-tier league. The club has failed to finish higher than third place (1952–53) in the highest league ever since.

After a disastrous 1962–63 season in which the team won none of the 32 games, the club was relegated to the Czechoslovak Second League until 1968. Overall, HC České Budějovice had been relegated to the second-tier league five other times since the 1958-59 season ; in each case the club re-earned promotion to the top league the following season.

Although it lost in the semifinals of the 2007–08 Czech Extraliga season, HC České Budějovice qualified for the 2008–09 Champions Hockey League as the winner of the regular season. However, its success was short-lived, as it finished eleventh and survived a relegation round the following season.

War of the Beers
Following the 2012–13 season, the Czech Extraliga reached a sponsorship deal with Radegast to sell its beer in all Extraliga arenas. This agreement conflicted with the deal České Budějovice already had with Budweiser Budvar Brewery for their arena. Under the agreement, the club and the city of České Budějovice would face stiff penalties for selling any beer other than Radegast products. Unable to resolve the dispute, the club decided on 18 June 2013 that no new agreement could be reached between the parties involved and voted to immediately relocate to Hradec Králové for the 2013-14 season.

In July 2013, plans were unveiled to resume professional hockey in České Budějovice, with a club playing in the Czech First National League.

Honours

Domestic
Czech Extraliga
  3rd place (3): 1994–95, 2007–08, 2021–22

Czechoslovak Extraliga
  Winners (1): 1950–51
  Runners-up (1): 1980–81
  3rd place (2): 1936–37, 1952–53

 Czechoslovak Second Ice Hockey League Championship (4): 1960, 1968, 1970, 1992 
 1st Czech Republic Hockey League Championship (4): 2005, 2017, 2019, 2020

Players

Current roster

Alumni
See :Category:Motor České Budějovice players for a list of HC České Budějovice players past and present.

References

External links

 Official website 

Ceske Budejovice
Ceske Budejovice
Sport in České Budějovice
Ice hockey clubs established in 1928
1928 establishments in Czechoslovakia